In organic chemistry, nitroamines are organic compounds with the general chemical structure . They consist of a nitro group bonded to an amine. The parent inorganic compound, where both R substituents are hydrogen, is nitramide, .

References

Functional groups